Trudy is the title character of a comic strip about a suburban homemaker by Jerry Marcus which debuted on March 18, 1963. It was syndicated until August 20, 2005, after Marcus died on July 22 of that year.

King Features Syndicate distributed the Sunday and daily strips to more than 200 newspapers worldwide.

Characters and story
Homemaker Trudy finds time to manage the house, her husband, their children and pets, including the family cat, Fatkat.

Marcus claimed the central character of Trudy was based on his mother, who had to raise four children in a Brooklyn cold-water flat after his father died when he was three years old.

References
Strickler, Dave. Syndicated Comic Strips and Artists, 1924–1995: The Complete Index. Cambria, California: Comics Access, 1995.

External links
King Features: Trudy

American comic strips
Gag-a-day comics
1963 comics debuts
2005 comics endings
American comics characters
Fictional American people
Fictional housewives
Comics characters introduced in 1963
Comics about women
Female characters in comics